Abraham Grünbaum (* 1930 in Poland, † June 7th 2001 in Zurich) was an orthodox rabbi and leader of a yeshiva in Bnei Brak. His death is one of the currently unsolved murder cases in Switzerland.

Grünbaum survived World War 2 in a work camp in Siberia, while his parents have been murdered in his native Poland.

Murder and aftermath
On a visit to Switzerland, Grünbaum was shot near 10:00 PM on the Weberstrasse road near the Hallwyl square when he was on his way to the maariv prayer. The two bullets, fired from at distance of less than two meters, hit Grünbaum in the upper body. An envelope containing more than 1000 Swiss Francs in donations, as well as his airline tickets, were still found on his body.

An involvement of the German right-wing NSU terror group in this murder has been debated, but as of 2017, there has not been any proof of such a connection.

See also
List of unsolved murders

External links

References

20th-century Polish rabbis
Israeli Rosh yeshivas
Male murder victims
Unsolved murders in Switzerland